Caspar Jander (born 23 March 2003) is a German professional footballer who plays as a midfielder for MSV Duisburg.

Career
Jander made his professional debut for MSV Duisburg on 23 January 2022, in the 3. Liga home match against 1. FC Saarbrücken. He signed a new contract on 2 February 2022, running until 2024. His first goal came in a 3–2 win over 1. FC Saarbrücken on 14 January 2023.

Career statistics

References

External links

2003 births
Living people
German footballers
Association football midfielders
MSV Duisburg players
3. Liga players
Sportspeople from Münster
Footballers from North Rhine-Westphalia
21st-century German people